The second season of the animated television series Johnny Test premiered on October 28, 2006 with "Hoist the Johnny Roger" and "Johnny's Turbo Toy Force" and ended on May 12, 2007 with episodes "Johnny X Strikes Again" and "Johnny vs. Super Soaking Cyborgs". This is the first season to use Adobe Flash instead of digital ink-and-paint, and the first to be produced in Canada instead of America. This season is also the first to be produced by Cookie Jar Entertainment and Collideascope Animation.

This season, along with the first, were released on DVD in a bundle on February 15, 2011 in Region 1.

This season marks the first appearance for Ashleigh Ball as the new voice of Mary Test, Sissy Blakely, and Missy.

Cast
 James Arnold Taylor as Johnny Test
 Louis Chirillo as Dukey
 Ashleigh Ball as Mary Test
 Maryke Hendrikse as Susan Test

Episodes

All episodes of this season were directed by Joseph Sherman.

</onlyinclude>

References 

Johnny Test seasons
2006 American television seasons
2007 American television seasons
2006 Canadian television seasons
2007 Canadian television seasons